Iwashita Eiichi (岩下 栄一, born Eiichi Iwashita; February 15, 1955 - January 21, 1999) was a sumo wrestler from Kisarazu, Chiba, Japan. He made his professional debut in November 1971, and reached the top division in July 1977. His highest rank was maegashira 8. He also fought under the shikona of Terunoyama (照の山) and Iwanami (岩波). He left the sumo world upon retirement in March 1984.

Career record

See also
Glossary of sumo terms
List of past sumo wrestlers
List of sumo tournament second division champions

References

1955 births
Japanese sumo wrestlers
Sumo people from Chiba Prefecture
1999 deaths
People from Kisarazu
Sumo wrestlers who use their birth name